Bombus wurflenii is a species of bumblebee found in several parts of central and northern Europe to Turkey and the Crimea peninsula in the southeast.

Description 
This bumblebee has a very short proboscis (tongue), powerful, toothed mandibles, and a short head. A lighter form, with most of thorax and the two anterior terga covered in pale fur exists.

Ecology 
The species is mainly found in mountainous areas. The nest is small, containing 80 to 150 individuals.

The bumblebee predominantly forages on flowers such as Vaccinium, Lamiaceae, Scrophulariaceae and Fabaceae.

Distribution 
In Europe, it can be found in Austria, Belgium, the Czech Republic, France, Germany, Hungary, Italy, Norway, Poland, Romania, Slovakia, Slovenia, Spain, Switzerland, Scandinavia, the Ural and Caucasus in Russia, northern Turkey, and the Crimean Peninsula. It is absent from the British Isles, and its presence in Finland is disputed.

References 

Bumblebees
Insects described in 1860
Hymenoptera of Europe